Robert Edward Morgan Williams (born 19 January 1987, in Pembury, Kent) is an English cricketer.

Williams made his first-class debut for Durham University Centre of Cricketing Excellence in three matches during 2007 as a six-foot right-arm medium-fast bowler, before impressing for the Middlesex second XI. He made his List A and County Championship debuts for Middlesex in September 2007. Opening the bowling with Steven Finn versus Essex, he achieved the distinction of taking five wickets in his first innings in county cricket. He dismissed Tom Westley, Tim Phillips, Essex captain Mark Pettini, Graham Napier and centurion Grant Flower. His figures were 28.4-4-112-5.

Williams signed for Leicestershire on a one-year deal at the end of the 2012 domestic season, after being released by Middlesex.

Career Best Performances
as of 27 September 2013

References

 Cricket Archive profile

1987 births
Living people
Durham MCCU cricketers
Alumni of St Mary's College, Durham
English cricketers
Leicestershire cricketers
Marylebone Cricket Club cricketers
Middlesex cricketers
People from Pembury